The 500–bed Specialty Hospital, Yangon is a specialty hospital in Yangon, Myanmar (Burma), which was formally opened on 25 Aug 2014. It is located on Min Ye Kyaw Swar Road in Lanmadaw Township and 20-minute walk from Yangon General Hospital. It was established by renovating the building that the Ministry of Energy used in the past. It was built by the Ministry of Health, Myanmar in cooperation with 4 private companies: Original Group, A1, Golden Flower and Shwe Taung Development. Over 7.6 million USD was provided by the companies and the Ministry of Health was responsible for interior decoration, equipment and staff. It is aimed to be the main facility for liver and kidney transplants in the future.

Health services have been providing in the hospital since 1 January 2014 while operation theater and special departments were in place at the end of June 2014. Under support of the government, a modular operation theater and air handing unit and a special ward have been operating since 30 June 2014. From January to July 2014, total 4,385 patients were admitted in the hospital and there have been 13,246 patients visited the hospital.

There are 5 professors, 8 senior consultants, 22 junior consultants, 25 civil assistant surgeons and 130 nurses in the hospital.

It is also a Tertiary Care Teaching Hospital affiliated with University of Medicine 1, Yangon and University of Medicine 2, Yangon.

Departments
There are 8 specialist departments and 12 auxiliary departments in the hospital. Departments of hepatology and urology, and 4 specialist units from Yangon General Hospital and New Yangon General Hospital were moved to the hospital. Rheumatology Department in the hospital is the first rheumatology department in Myanmar.

Specialist departments
 Department of Hepatology
 Department of Hepatobiliary Surgery
 Department of Nephrology
 Department of Respiratory Medicine 
 Department of Rheumatology
 Department of Thoracic Surgery
 Department of Urology
 Physical Medicine & Rehabilitation Unit

Diagnostics departments
 Radiology Department
 Pathology Department

Teaching programs
The 500-bed Specialty Hospital is one of the teaching hospitals of the University of Medicine 1, Yangon and University of Medicine 2, Yangon for pre-graduate and post-graduate programmes and courses.

See also
 List of hospitals in Yangon

References

Hospitals in Yangon
Hospitals established in 2014
2014 establishments in Myanmar